Homayoun Shajarian (born May 21, 1975) is an Iranian singer. He is the son of Mohammad-Reza Shajarian.

Early life 
Shajarian was born in Tehran and is the son of Mohammad-Reza Shajarian, a grand master vocalist of Persian traditional music. At a young age, he began studying the tombak, a Persian hand drum, and Persian traditional vocal Avaz.

Shajarian attended Tehran Conservatory of Music choosing Kamancheh as his professional instrument and was tutored by Ardeshir Kamkar. In 1991, he accompanied his father in concerts of Ava Music Ensemble in the United States, Europe and Iran, playing Tombak and from 1999 on, he started accompanying his father also on vocals. In 1995 he married Guitta Khansari, their child, Yasmine Shajarian, was born in 2007 in Tehran, Iran. They were divorced in 2015. His first independent work Nassim-e Vasl, composed by Mohammad Javad Zarrabian, was released on his 28th birthday, on 21 May 2003. He performed live-stream concert on 24 May 2020 during coronavirus pandemic.

Discography

Studio albums

 Scream (2003)
 Wind of Reaching (2003)

 Impatient (2004)
 Passion of Friend (2004)
 Role of Dream (2005)
 With Stars (2006)
 Koli Ghaychak (2007)
 Sun of Wish (2008)
 Water, Bread, Song (2009)
 Night of Separation (2010)
 My Love Don't Leave Without Me (2012)
 Heavenly (2012)
 What Fires (2013)
 Gods of Secrets (2015)
 In Oblivion (2022)

Collaborative albums
 Tune & Faith (1998) (with Mohammad Reza Shajarian)
 Can't Go On Living Without You (2002) (with Mohammad Reza Shajarian)
 Turmoil of Lovers (2007) (with Mohammad Reza Shajarian)
 Love Letter (2011) (with Abdolghader Maraghi Ensemble)
 Simorgh (2013) (with Simorgh Orchestra, Hamid Motebassem)
 Beyond Any Form (2014) (with Tahmoures Pournazeri)
 The Lord of the Secrets (2015) (with Sohrab Pournazari, Siavash Ensemble)
 Sleep Next to My Love Poems Tonight (2017) (with Fardin Khal Atbari)
 The Occult and the Intoxicated (2017) (with Jano Baghoumian)
 My Iran (2018) (with Sohrab Pournazeri)
 The Myth of Your Eyes (2019) (with Alireza Ghorbani, Mahyar Alizadeh)

Soundtrack albums
 Hard Makeup (2014) (with Sohrab Pournazeri)
 Subdued (2017) (with Sohrab Pournazeri)

Extended plays
 Mind (2020) (with Seventh Soul, Mohammad Reza Shajarian)

Singles

See also 
 Music of Iran
 List of Iranian musicians

References

External links

 Interview with BBC

1975 births
Living people
Iranian musicians
People from Tehran
Singers from Tehran
Iranian male singers
Iranian folk singers
Barbad award winners
21st-century drummers
Iranian tonbak players
Persian-language singers
Iranian kamancheh players
Iranian classical singers
Persian classical musicians
21st-century Iranian male singers